Brockton is a settlement in the western portion of Prince Edward Island.

Communities in Prince County, Prince Edward Island